The Disneyland Resort, commonly known as Disneyland, is an entertainment resort in Anaheim, California. It is owned and operated by The Walt Disney Company through its Parks, Experiences and Products division and is home to two theme parks (Disneyland Park and Disney California Adventure), three hotels, and a shopping, dining, and entertainment district known as Downtown Disney.

The resort was developed by Walt Disney in the 1950s. When it opened to guests on July 17, 1955, the property consisted of Disneyland, its 100-acre parking lot (which had 15,167 spaces), and the Disneyland Hotel, owned and operated by Disney's business partner Jack Wrather. After the success with the multi-park, multi-hotel business model at Walt Disney World in Lake Buena Vista, Florida, Disney acquired large parcels of land adjacent to Disneyland to apply the same business model in Anaheim.

During the expansion, the property was named the Disneyland Resort to encompass the entire complex, while the original theme park was named Disneyland Park. The company purchased the Disneyland Hotel from the Wrather Company and the Pan Pacific Hotel from the Tokyu Group. The Pan Pacific Hotel became Disney's Paradise Pier Hotel in 2000. In 2001 the property saw the addition of Disney's Grand Californian Hotel & Spa, a second theme park, named Disney California Adventure, and the Downtown Disney shopping, dining, and entertainment district.

History

Concept and construction

Walt Disney's early concepts for an amusement park called for a "Mickey Mouse Park" located adjacent to the Walt Disney Studios in Burbank (presently the site of the West Coast headquarters of ABC). As new ideas emerged, Walt and his brother Roy realized that the Burbank location would be too small for the project, and hired a consultant from Stanford Research Institute to provide them with information on locations and economic feasibility. The consultant recommended a remote location in Anaheim, adjacent to the then-under-construction Santa Ana Freeway. The consultant correctly predicted that the locationcovered by orange groves at the timewould become the population center of Southern California. Since the location was far from Southern California population centers in the 1950s, Walt Disney wanted to build a hotel so that Disneyland visitors traveling long distances could stay overnight. However, the park had depleted his financial resources, so he negotiated a deal with Hollywood producer Jack Wrather in which he would build and operate a hotel called the Disneyland Hotel across the street from Disneyland.

In 1963, city planner James Rouse, in a commencement speech at the Harvard Graduate School of Design, called Disneyland “the greatest piece of urban design in the United States today."

1955–1998: one park, one hotel
Disneyland opened on July 17, 1955, with a televised press preview event on ABC, and the inauguration drew nearly 30,000 guests on the first day   Despite the disastrous event, later dubbed "Black Sunday", during which several rides broke down, and other mishaps occurred, Disneyland became a huge success in its first year of operation. The hotel, which opened three months after the park, enjoyed similar success. Walt Disney wanted to build more facilities for Disneyland visitors to stay in Anaheim, but since his financial resources were drained, entrepreneurs established their own independent hotels in the area surrounding the park and hotel to capitalize on Disneyland's success.

To Walt Disney's dismay, the city of Anaheim was lax in restricting their construction, eager for the tax revenue generated by more hotels in the city. The area surrounding Disneyland became suffused with the kind of tacky atmosphere of colorful lights, flashy neon signs, and then-popular Googie architecture which he had wanted to avoid (and which years earlier had caused the city of Burbank to deny his initial request to build his project in Burbank). The Anaheim Convention Center was built across the street from Disneyland's original parking lot, and residences were constructed in the area as part of the city's growth in the late 20th century. Eventually, Disneyland was "boxed in", a factor which would later lead Walt Disney to acquire a significantly larger parcel of land for the construction of Walt Disney World. The Walt Disney Company gradually acquired the land west of the park, notably the Disneyland Hotel in 1988 following Jack Wrather's death in 1984, the Pan Pacific Hotel (now Disney's Paradise Pier Hotel) in 1995, and several properties north of the Disneyland Hotel in the mid to late 1990s.

1998–2001: planning an expansion
After Walt's and Roy's deaths in 1966 and 1971, respectively, the Walt Disney Company would go on to achieve success with the multi-park, multi-hotel resort complex business model of Walt Disney World in Florida, which opened in 1971. In the 1990s, Disney decided to turn Disneyland into a similar multi-park, multi-hotel resort destination. In 1991, Disney announced plans to build WestCOT, a theme park based on Walt Disney World's EPCOT Center, on the site of the original Disneyland parking lot. Its estimated cost was US$3 billion, largely due to the cost of land that Disney would need to acquire. With the new Euro Disney Resort, which opened in 1992, becoming a financial and public relations albatross for the company, Disney was unable to finance the project, and cancelled WestCOT in 1995. That summer, Disney executives gathered in Aspen, Colorado for a 3-day retreat, where they came up with the idea for a California-themed park, dubbed Disney's California Adventure Park, to be built on the same site slated for WestCOT. $1.4 billion was budgeted to build the park, a retail district, and hotels.

2001–present: Disneyland Resort complex

In January 2015, Tom Staggs, Disney Parks chair, and Steve Davison, VP of Park Entertainment, announced upcoming changes to the park to celebrate the park's 60th anniversary. The changes began on May 22, 2015, and ran for sixteen months. The updates included an updated World of Color water show, Paint the Night parade, and a new fireworks show titled Disneyland Forever. Disney California Adventure also received a makeover, with Condor Flats remade into Grizzly Peak Airfield and Soarin' Over California equipped with a new laser projection system. Peter Pan's Flight reopened on July 1.

In October 2017, Disney announced a new Pixar Pals parking structure for the resort, which includes a 6,500-space parking structure, and a new transportation hub, which opened in July 2019. The parking structure opened in June 2019 and is now used daily.

In August 2015, it was announced that Disneyland Park would receive a 14-acre Star Wars-themed land scheduled to open in 2019. It opened on May 31, 2019. Star Wars: Galaxy's Edge is home of two attractions, Millennium Falcon – Smugglers Run, and Star Wars: Rise of the Resistance.

In March 2018, it was announced that A Bug's Land would close in September 2018. It was replaced by Avengers Campus which was set to open July 18, 2020, but was delayed due to the COVID-19 pandemic and opened on June 4, 2021.

In April 2019, Disneyland announced that Mickey & Minnie's Runaway Railway would be coming to Disneyland in 2023. The attraction was built behind Mickey's Toontown in a former backstage area and opened on January 27, 2023. 

In January 2021, officials announced that the resort will be the first "super" COVID-19 vaccination site in Orange County, California. As one of several "super POD" (Point-of-Dispensing) locations, it is expected that thousands of residents will be able to be vaccinated against COVID-19 each day.

Future expansion and proposed DisneylandForward

Disney announced plans to build a fourth hotel at the resort in 2016, slated for an opening in 2021.  In August 2018, the hotel was placed on hold indefinitely because of a dispute with the city of Anaheim, which concerned a tax rebate that would have subsidized the hotel's construction. Later, the hotel was cancelled as Disney and Anaheim could not come to an agreement on the tax rebate.

In March 2021, the Walt Disney Company announced a new project for the Anaheim, California resort called Disneyland Forward. This proposal is designed to change the city of Anaheim's zoning rules so that Disney can build more theme park space for both Disneyland and Disney California Adventure. Proposals have included building more space where Disney's Paradise Pier hotel and the surrounding parking lots on the west-side of the resort currently reside. Rumors have surfaced that a new version of a mixed-use Disney Springs would be built near the Toy Story parking lot.

Location

The Disneyland Resort is located several miles south of downtown Anaheim, in an area branded by the city as the Anaheim Resort near the border of neighboring Garden Grove. The resort is generally bounded by Harbor Boulevard to the east, Katella Avenue to the south, Walnut Street to the west and Ball Road to the north. Interstate 5 borders the resort at an angle on the northeastern corner.

Not all land bordered by these streets is part of the Disneyland Resort, particularly near the intersection of Harbor Boulevard and Katella Avenue, and along Ball Road between Disneyland Drive and Walnut Street. Disneyland Drive cuts through the resort on a north–south route and provides access to the Mickey & Friends Parking Structure, Downtown Disney, and the three hotels. Magic Way connects Walnut Street to Disneyland Drive just south of the Mickey & Friends Parking Structure and provides access to the parking structure, Disneyland Hotel, and Downtown Disney.

Special offramps from Interstate 5 combined with a reversible flyover over the intersection of Ball Road and Disneyland Drive permit access into and out of the Mickey & Friends parking garage during peak morning and evening traffic times. The official address of the resort is 1313 South Harbor Boulevard; the address number is a Hidden Mickey.

Attractions

Parks
 Disneyland Park, the original theme park built by Walt Disney, which opened on July 17, 1955.
 Disney California Adventure Park, a theme park based on the history and culture of California, which opened on February 8, 2001.

Shopping, Dining, and Entertainment
 Downtown Disney, an outdoor retail, dining, and entertainment district located between the entrance promenade of the Disneyland Resort theme parks and the Disneyland Hotel.

Hotels
 Disneyland Hotel, the resort's original hotel built by Jack Wrather which opened on October 5, 1955, and was purchased by Disney in 1988.
 Disney's Paradise Pier Hotel, a hotel themed after the section of Disney California Adventure it overlooks. Formerly operated by the Tokyu Group (opening in 1984 under the name Emerald of Anaheim), the hotel was purchased by Disney in December 1995, for a reported US$36 million, and renamed the Disneyland Pacific Hotel. As part of the 1998-2001 expansion of the resort, it was re-branded as Disney's Paradise Pier Hotel. The lobby and convention/banquet facilities have undergone several renovations since the re-branding, most notably in 2004 and 2005. On April 27, 2022, Disney announced that the hotel will be re-themed to the artwork of Pixar Animation Studios. On September 11, 2022, it was announced that the name would be the Pixar Place Hotel.
 Disney's Grand Californian Hotel & Spa, based on the Craftsman style of architecture of the early 1900s, which opened on January 2, 2001.

Attendance
The 2019 issue of "TEA/AECOM 2018 Theme Index and Museum Index: The Global Attractions Attendance Report" reported the following attendance estimates for 2018 compiled by the Themed Entertainment Association:
 Disneyland: 18,666,000 visits (No. 2 worldwide/in the US, up 2% from 2017)
 Disney's California Adventure: 9,861,000 visits (No. 11 worldwide/No. 7 in the US, up 3% from 2017)

Ticket prices
Approximately 60,000 people visited the park on Disneyland's opening day, July 17, 1955, when park admission was priced at $1 for adults and $0.50 for children. This did not include access to rides and other individual attractions; attraction tickets could be purchased separately for $0.10 to $0.35. Single attraction tickets were permanently eliminated in June 1982; access to all the park's attractions was henceforth included in the price of park admission tickets.

Admission prices have greatly increased since the gates first opened, due in part to inflation, the continuing construction and renovation of attractions, and the addition of a second theme park, Disney California Adventure.  one-day "Park Hopper" tickets, allowing entry to both Disneyland Park and Disney California Adventure, are priced between $154 (on "Value" days) & $199 (on "Peak" days) for adults, and between $148 ("Value") & $191 ("Peak") for children. Visitors can also purchase one-park tickets and multi-day tickets.

In addition to daily tickets, in 1984 the Premium Annual Passport was introduced to the public. The Premium Annual Passport granted daily entry for a year at a time for $65 for adults and $49 for children. There were five different types of Annual Passports available for purchase, which are the Disney Signature Plus Passport ($1,449), the Disney Signature Passport ($1,199), the Disney Deluxe Passport ($829), the Disney Flex Passport ($649), and the Disney Southern California Select Passport ($399).

On January 14, 2021, Disneyland announced that they would be canceling the annual passport program.  Disneyland Resort president Ken Potrock stated, "Due to the continued uncertainty of the pandemic and limitations around the reopening of our California theme parks, we will be issuing appropriate refunds for eligible Disneyland resort Annual Passports and sunsetting the current program." A replacement program was announced on August 3, 2021, titled "Magic Keys." There are four different tiers of Magic Keys available: Dream Key ($1,339), Believe Key ($949), Enchant Key ($649), and Imagine Key ($399).

Management

Executives
The president of Disneyland Resort is Ken Potrock. Potrock reports to Josh D'Amaro, Chairman of Parks, Experiences and Consumer Products.

Current management
 President, Disneyland Resort – Ken Potrock
 Senior Vice President, Operations – Patrick Finnegan
 Vice President, Disneyland Park – Kris Thieler
 Vice President, Disneyland Resort Hotels & Aulani, a Disney Resort & Spa – Elliot Mills

Past management:
 President, Disneyland Resort – Rebecca Campbell (2019–2020)
 President, Disneyland Resort – Josh D'Amaro (2018–2019)
 President, Disneyland Resort – Michael Colglazier (2013–2018)
 President, Disneyland Resort – George Kalogridis (2009–2013)
 President, Disneyland Resort – Ed Grier (2006–2009)
 President, Disneyland Resort – Matt Ouimet (2003–2006)
 President, Disneyland Resort – Cynthia Harriss (1999–2003)
 President, Disneyland Resort – Paul Pressler (1994–1999; Chairman of Walt Disney Parks and Resorts, 1999–2002)
 President, Disneyland Resort – Jack Lindquist (1990–1994)
 Former Vice President, Downtown Disney and Disneyland Resort Hotels 1998–2012 – Tony Bruno
 Former Executive Vice President – Dick Nunis (1972–1980)

Operations
The day-to-day operations of the resort are overseen by a hierarchy of operations managers or "stage managers", who change with each shift. They are colloquially known by their radio call signs, which usually contain the manager's department name (e.g., "Merch", "Foods") and an identifying number. Usually "One" denotes the manager in charge of that department for Disneyland Park, "Two" denotes the same for Disney California Adventure, "Three" denotes the same for the resort hotels, and "Four" denotes the same for Downtown Disney.

See also

 Incidents at Disney parks
 Large amusement railways
 List of Disney attractions that were never built
 Rail transport in Walt Disney Parks and Resorts

References

External links

 
 

 
1955 establishments in California
Walt Disney Parks and Resorts
Tourist attractions in Anaheim, California
Buildings and structures in Anaheim, California
Amusement parks opened in 1955
History of Anaheim, California